Emad Hamed Noor (born 21 April 1990) is a Saudi Arabian middle-distance runner. He represented his country at the 2012 Summer Olympics.

Running career

Junior career
Noor's first appearance at a major international competition took place when he ran the 1500 metres at the 2007 Pan Arab Games, recording a time of 3:51.34 (min:sec) at the age of 17. At the 2008 Asian Junior Athletics Championships, he finished in second in the 1500 metres with a time of 3:49.47.

Senior career
In the 1500 metre race at the 2009 Asian Athletics Championships, he finished fourth overall in the final round in a race won by compatriot Mohammed Shaween. In the 1500 metres race at the 2012 Summer Olympics, he did not qualify beyond the preliminaries although he ran a time of 3:42.95. Noor won his first medal at the 2013 Asian Athletics Championships, where he finished in first place in the 1500 metre race.

See also
Saudi Arabia Track and Field at the 2012 Summer Olympics

References

External links

1990 births
Living people
Saudi Arabian male middle-distance runners
Olympic athletes of Saudi Arabia
Athletes (track and field) at the 2012 Summer Olympics
Athletes (track and field) at the 2010 Asian Games
People from 'Asir Province
World Athletics Championships athletes for Saudi Arabia
Asian Games competitors for Saudi Arabia
Olympic male middle-distance runners
21st-century Saudi Arabian people
20th-century Saudi Arabian people